Cara Black and Virginia Ruano Pascual were the defending champions, but none competed this year.

María Vento-Kabchi and Angelique Widjaja won the title by defeating Émilie Loit and Nicole Pratt 7–5, 6–2 in the final.

Seeds

Draw

Draw

References

External links
 Official results archive (ITF)

2003 WTA Tour
Commonwealth Bank Tennis Classic
Sport in Indonesia